Pârâul Roșu may refer to the following rivers in Romania:

 Pârâul Roșu, tributary of the Azuga in Brașov County
 Pârâul Roșu (Olteț), tributary of the Olteț in Olt County
 Pârâul Roșu, tributary of the Teleajen in Prahova County

See also
 Valea Roșie (disambiguation)